Exophony is the practice of (normally creative) writing in a language that is not one's mother tongue. While the practice is age-old, the term is relatively new: the German equivalent, exophonie, was used within the field of literary and cultural studies by Susan Arndt, Dirk Naguschewski and Robert Stockhammer in 2007.

Some exophonic authors may be  bilingual or multilingual from their childhood years, even polyglots, while others may write in an acquired language. In some cases the second language is acquired early in life, for example through immigration, and it is not always clear whether the writer should strictly be classed a non-native speaker.

In other cases, the language is acquired through exile or migration: "Exophonic writing, the phenomenon of writing literature in a second language, is increasing across Europe due to labour migration".

It is one form of transnational literature, although the latter also encompasses writing that crosses national stylistic or cultural boundaries without being written in another language. "Extraterritoriality and exophony are indeed important notions, not only for comparative literature but in general for the question of the status of the literary text [of] the 21st century".

It also overlaps with translingualism, and translingualist writer is one of many terms that has been coined to describe the phenomenon. Related concepts in English include transculturalism/transculturation, axial writing, postnationalism and postcolonialism, and in German, Exophonie, Anders-Sprachigkeit, Interkulturelle Literatur ('intercultural literature'), Gastarbeiterliteratur ('guest worker literature'), Ausländerliteratur ('foreigner literature') and Migrantenliteratur ('migrant literature').

Motivations for becoming an exophonic writer may be manifold: to make a political statement (for example, Yoko Tawada attempted "to produce exophony both in her mother tongue (Japanese) and her acquired tongue (German) ... to dismantle ... the ultranationalistic concept of a 'beautiful' Japanese language"), to adopt/avoid stylistic elements of particular languages ("for Tawada, a native speaker of a language whose grammar makes no distinctions of gender, case, definite and indefinite articles, or singular and plural ... each Western word, phrase or idiom becomes a conundrum", "I grope for some unlikely expression in my native language, trying to find the proper equivalence in translation for an English word or phrase"), to evade the risk of being lost in translation, or to gain a wider readership – translated literature in the UK and US accounts for only a small percentage of sales, so "it makes commercial sense". When asked why he didn’t write in his native language, Joseph Conrad replied, "I value too much our beautiful Polish literature to introduce into it my worthless twaddle. But for Englishmen my capacities are just sufficient."

Some exophonic authors are also translators, including (in some cases) of their own works. Conversely, translation of exophonic works can present problems due to the "defamiliarisation of the new language through stylistic innovation".

See also
List of exophonic writers
Second language writing

References

Further reading
Exophony and the Locations of (Cultural) Identity in Levy Hideo's Fiction , Faye Yuan Kleeman, retrieved 28 February 2017
The unprepared future of an exophonic refugee, Al Filreis, retrieved 28 February 2017
Voluntary Exile, Michael F. Moore, retrieved 28 February 2017
The Fall of Language in the Age of English, Elisa Taber's review in Asymptote of Minae Mizumura's book, retrieved 28 February 2017
Dan Vyleta's top 10 books in second languages, Dan Vyleta in The Guardian, retrieved 28 February 2017
Why writing in English was a good career move for Nabokov, Conrad – and now Chirovici, Toby Lichtig in The Daily Telegraph, retrieved 28 February 2017

 
Literature by language